Ethyl hexanoate is the ester resulting from the condensation of hexanoic acid and ethanol. It has fruity aroma similar to apple peel.

References 

Ethyl esters
Caproate esters